Catalina is a commune in Covasna County, Transylvania, Romania, composed of five villages:

Catalina / Szentkatolna
Hătuica / Hatolyka
Imeni / Imecsfalva
Mărcușa / Kézdimárkosfalva
Mărtineni / Kézdimártonfalva

It formed part of the Székely Land region of the historical Transylvania province. Until the Treaty of Trianon, it belonged to the Háromszék County of the Kingdom of Hungary.

People
 Vasile Luca (8 June 1898 – 23 July 1963), Austro-Hungarian-born Romanian and Soviet communist politician

Demographics
The commune has an absolute Székely Hungarian majority. According to the 2011 census, it has a population of 3,359 of which 98.84% or 3,320 are Hungarian.

References

Communes in Covasna County
Localities in Transylvania